Hack is a programming language for the HipHop Virtual Machine (HHVM), created by Facebook as a dialect of PHP. The language implementation is open-source, licensed under the MIT License.

Hack allows programmers to use both dynamic typing and static typing.  This kind of a type system is called gradual typing, which is also implemented in other programming languages such as ActionScript.  Hack's type system allows types to be specified for function arguments, function return values, and class properties; however, types of local variables are always inferred and cannot be specified.

History
Hack was introduced on March 20, 2014. Before the announcement of the new programming language, Facebook had already implemented the code and tested it on a large portion of its web site.

Features
Hack is designed to interoperate seamlessly with PHP, which is a widely used open-source scripting language that has a focus on web development and can be embedded into HTML.  A majority of valid PHP scripts are also valid in Hack; however, numerous less frequently used PHP features and language constructs are not supported in Hack.

Hack extends the type hinting available in PHP 5 through the introduction of static typing, by adding new type hints (for example, for scalar types such as integer or string), as well as by extending the use of type hints (for example, for class properties or function return values).  However, types of local variables cannot be specified. Since Hack uses a gradual typing system, in the default mode, type annotations are not mandatory even in places they cannot be inferred; the type system will assume the author is correct and admit the code. However, a "strict" mode is available which requires such annotations, and thus enforces fully sound code.

Syntax and semantics 
The basic file structure of a Hack script is similar to a PHP script with a few changes. A Hack file does not include the <?php opening markup tag and forbids using top-level declarations. Code must be placed in an entrypoint function. These are automatically executed if they are in the top-level file, but not if the file is included via include, require, or the autoloader. Like other functions in Hack, the function names must be unique within a project – i.e. projects with multiple entrypoints can not call both main :

<<__EntryPoint>>
function main(): void {
  echo 'Hello, World!';
}

The above script, similar to PHP, will be executed and the following output is sent to the browser:

Hello, World!

Unlike PHP, Hack and HTML code do not mix; either XHP or another template engine needs to be used.

Functions
Like PHP 7, Hack allows types to be specified for function arguments and function return values. Functions in Hack are thus annotated with types like the following:

// Hack functions are annotated with types.
function negate(bool $x): bool {
    return !$x;
}

See also 

 Parrot virtual machine
 Phalanger

External links 
  and 
 Facebook Q&A: Hack brings static typing to PHP world
 A tutorial on converting an existing PHP project to Hack
 KPHP: An Executable Formal Semantics for PHP

2014 software
Dynamically typed programming languages
Facebook
PHP software
Programming languages compiled to bytecode
Programming languages created in 2014
Scripting languages
Statically typed programming languages